Košarkaški klub Podgorica, commonly referred to as KK Podgorica, is a men's professional basketball club based in Podgorica, Montenegro. The club has the same management structure as Budućnost Bemax. They are currently competing in the Montenegrin First League and the ABA League Second Division.

History 
The club played the 2011–12 season in the Montenegrin League. In the 2019–20 season, Podgorica won the First B League and got promoted to the First A League for the 2020–21 season. In June 2020, they have received a wild card for the 2020–21 season of the ABA League Second Division.

Players

Current roster

Head coaches 

  Petar Mijović (2011–2012)
  Vladan Radović (2019–2020)
  Zoran Kašćelan (2020–2021)
  Nebojša Bogavac (2021–present)

Notable players 

  Marko Mugoša
  Nikola Žižić

References

External links 
 
 Club profile at eurobasket.com
 Club profile at realgm.com

Podgorica
Podgorica
Sport in Podgorica
Podgorica